The 3 arrondissements of the Vosges department are:
 Arrondissement of Épinal, (prefecture of the Vosges department: Épinal) with 236 communes. The population of the arrondissement was 204,222 in 2016.  
 Arrondissement of Neufchâteau, (subprefecture: Neufchâteau) with 175 communes. The population of the arrondissement was 53,669 in 2016.  
 Arrondissement of Saint-Dié-des-Vosges, (subprefecture: Saint-Dié-des-Vosges) with 96 communes. The population of the arrondissement was 111,750 in 2016.

History

In 1800 the arrondissements of Épinal, Mirecourt, Neufchâteau, Remiremont and Saint-Dié were established. The arrondissements of Mirecourt and Remiremont were disbanded in 1926. In January 2013 the two cantons of Darney and Monthureux-sur-Saône passed from the arrondissement of Épinal to the arrondissement of Neufchâteau.

The borders of the arrondissements of Vosges were modified in January 2019:
 two communes from the arrondissement of Épinal to the arrondissement of Neufchâteau
 15 communes from the arrondissement of Épinal to the arrondissement of Saint-Dié-des-Vosges
 32 communes from the arrondissement of Neufchâteau to the arrondissement of Épinal
 seven communes from the arrondissement of Saint-Dié-des-Vosges to the arrondissement of Épinal

References

Vosges